Herman, Margrave of Brandenburg, also known as Herman the Tall ( – 1 February 1308), a member of the House of Ascania, was Margrave and co-ruler of Brandenburg with his cousin Margrave Otto IV of Brandenburg-Stendal.

Life 
Herman  was the son of Margrave Otto V of Brandenburg-Salzwedel and his wife Judith, daughter of the Franconian count Herman I of Henneberg. In 1299, he succeeded his father as co-regent of Brandenburg, which he ruled jointly with his cousin Otto IV. After the death of the Piast duke Bolko I of Jawor, he exercised the guardianship over Bolko's children.

In 1308, war broke out between Brandenburg and the Duchy of Mecklenburg, the so-called North German Margrave War. Herman and Otto invaded Mecklenburg and Herman died during the siege of Lübz. He was buried in the Lehnin Abbey.

Marriage and issue 
In 1295 he married Anne of Austria (1280-1327), the daughter of the late Habsburg king Albert I of Germany. They had four children:
 Jutta (1297-1353), heiress of Coburg, married to Count Henry VIII of Henneberg (d. 1347)
 John V (1302-1317), his successor
 Matilda (d. 1323), heiress of Lower Lusatia, married Duke Henry IV "the Faithful" of Glogau (d. 1342)
 Agnes (1297-1334), heiress of the Altmark, married Waldemar, Margrave of Brandenburg (1281-1381).  In 1319, she married her second husband, Duke Otto of Brunswick-Lüneburg, Prince of Göttingen (1290-1344).

References 
 

Margraves of Brandenburg
House of Ascania
1270s births
1308 deaths
Year of birth uncertain
13th-century German nobility
14th-century German nobility